Ivan Vysotskiy (born 7 July 1962) is a Ukrainian rower. He competed in the men's coxless four event at the 1988 Summer Olympics.

References

1962 births
Living people
Ukrainian male rowers
Olympic rowers of the Soviet Union
Rowers at the 1988 Summer Olympics